Douglas John Foskett OBE (27 June 1918 – 7 May 2004) was a British librarian and library and information scientist, and author of several special faceted classification systems.

Foskett was born in London on 27 June 1918. He received his BA from Queen Mary College in 1939 and in 1954 his MA at Birkbeck, University of London. He started his career in the late 1930s as a librarian in the Ilford Public Libraries in Essex. During World War II he served in the Royal Army Medical Corps and later in the Intelligence Corps. From 1948 to 1957 he was Head of Information in the Research Division of the Metal Box Company Limited. In 1957 to 1978 he was at the Library of the Institute of Education in London, where he devised and implemented the specialist  London Education Classification scheme to organize the library's collections. The last five years before retirement he was Director at the Central Library Services of the University of London.

In the early 1950s Foskett was among the founding members of the Classification Research Group. He was active member of British Library Association. For 5 years he was a member of Unesco's International Advisory Committee on Libraries, Documentation and Archives. Also visiting Professor in MIT, in Ghana, Ibadan, Brazil and Iceland.

His brother, Tony (1926–2014), was also a librarian and teacher of information science.

Publications 
Books, a selection:
 1952. Assistance to readers in lending libraries
 1958. Library Classification and the Field of Knowledge
 1965. How to Find Out: Educational Research
 1967. Information service in libraries
 1974. Classification and indexing in the social sciences
 1974. The London Education Classification (with Joy Foskett)
 1977. Notes on Compiling Bibliographies: For the Guidance of Students 
 1980. Encyclopedia of Library and Information Science. With A. Kent 
 1983. Reader in Comparative Librarianship 
 1984. Pathways for communication: books and libraries in the information age

References

External links 
 
 Notes for: Douglas J Foskett

1918 births
2004 deaths
English librarians
British information theorists
Officers of the Order of the British Empire
British Army personnel of World War II
Royal Army Medical Corps soldiers
Intelligence Corps soldiers